Chadalada is a south Indian village in Peddapuram Mandal in East Godavari District of Andhra Pradesh, India.

References
 Pincode Numbers in East Gaodavari Dist
 Chadalada VILLAGE Population Data 
 2001 census

Villages in East Godavari district